The Charedi Council of Jerusalem (haEdah haCharedit, Ashkenazi pronunciation: ha-Aideh Charaidis or ha-Eido ha-Chareidis; "Congregation of God-Fearers") is a large Haredi Jewish communal organization based in Jerusalem, with several thousands affiliated households. It is led by an independent rabbinical court, chaired by the Gaon Convenor, acronymed Ga'avad, and operated by the Rabbi Convenor, Ra'avad. The Council provides facilities such as dietary laws supervision, ritual baths, a Sabbath enclosure, and welfare services. The Council was founded in 1921 by devout Ashkenazi residents of Jerusalem, especially of the Old Yishuv, who refused to be affiliated in any way with the new Zionist institutions.

Inspired by militant anti-Zionist ideology, it refuses to receive any state funding from the Israeli authorities, or to endorse voting in the elections, relying on donations from fellow anti-Zionist Haredi Jews abroad and its own income. Its members often engage in demonstrations against Sabbath desecration, autopsies, or archaeological excavations of human remains, which they regard as sins, and are noted for their poverty and extreme religious strictness. The Council also sponsors a very small Sephardi Haredi Council.

History

The Edah HaChareidis was founded by Rabbi Yosef Chaim Sonnenfeld and Rabbi Yitzchok Yerucham Diskin (son of Rabbi Yehoshua Leib Diskin) in 1921, prior to the establishment of the Chief Rabbinate by the Zionist movement under British auspices, which saw Rabbi Sonnenfeld named as the first Av Beis Din, a position he held until his death in 1932. His tenure saw the Ottoman Empire's control over the Land of Israel vanish, to be replaced with the British control of the region under the British Mandate of Palestine after World War I.

The Edah HaChareidis, which was – and still is – strongly anti-Zionist, resisted these moves, and opposed the new British-created Zionist Chief Rabbinate. Rabbi Sonnenfeld was succeeded by

 Rabbi Yosef Tzvi Dushinsky, who was succeeded by
 Rabbi Zelig Reuven Bengis, who was succeeded by the 
 Satmar Rebbe, Grand Rabbi Joel Teitelbaum. Rabbi Teitelbaum emigrated to the United States, but retained his position as chief of the OCJ. Teitelbaum's nephew, the late Grand Rabbi
 Moshe Teitelbaum of Satmar, was given the title of President upon Rabbi Joel Teitelbaum's death

Meanwhile, in 1945, the Edah parted ways with Agudat Yisrael. The lay leader of the body for many years was Gershon Stemmer, until his death in early 2007.

Anti-Zionist ideology
The anti-Zionist stance of the Edah HaChareidis is ideologically derived from the book Vayoel Moshe, written by its former President and Chief Rabbi, Joel Teitelbaum, which is regarded as the standard, and by which all issues relating to the modern State of Israel are determined. For example, the Congregation forbids voting in the elections for the Knesset, and forbids accepting any funding from the Israeli government (such as subsidies for schools and unemployment benefits), and also does not accept Israeli citizenship through the Law of Return. According to Ynetnews, "It [the Edah] has declared an ideological war against the 'heretic Zionist government'."

The state-run "Chief Rabbinate" recognizes marriage and divorce performed by the Edah's rabbinic court, per a settlement hearkening back to British rule. Yet, like all those performed by non-governmental bodies, converts to Judaism who convert through the Edah's courts are neither recognized nor eligible for citizenship under the Law of Return.

In 2002, the rabbinical leadership of the Edah wrote a complementary introduction to Vayoel Moshe. The introduction mentioned: "and it is necessary to learn about this subject [of Zionism]... the holy book Vayoel Moshe will open [its readers'] eyes to see [the reasons behind] all troubles and horrors of our time, and will prevent readers from being drawn after the Zionist heresy, may the Merciful One save us."

In 2006, during a campaign against the participation of Haredim in the Israeli parliamentary elections, the Edah accused the Zionists of having played a role in the Holocaust.

In March 2008, an article in the Edah's newspaper HaEdah blasted the "first Hasidic police officer" and the newspapers who had praised him, and called for him to be thrown out of the Haredi world. It referred to him as presenting his children to Molech. Addressing him personally, it said: "and even if you are great in your own eyes, you are worth nothing and an embarrassment to us"; and: "We will continue our continuous war, the days of which are the same as the days of the existence of the Zionist entity, against them and against everything you represent."

Influence
Followers of the movements that constitute the Edah HaChareidis mainly live in the northern areas of Jerusalem (from Har Nof to Sanhedria, and in Mea Shearim), and in Beit Shemesh. The Edah HaChareidis includes the following groups: Satmar, Dushinsky, Toldos Aharon, Toldos Avrohom Yitzchok, Spinka, Sanz-Tshokave, groups belonging to the Perushim (such as a more "moderate" wing of Neturei Karta), a faction of the Breslover Hasidim, led by Rabbi Yaakov Meir Shechter, and Mishkenos HoRoim. The Edah HaChareidis publicizes a weekly magazine called HaEdah ("The Edah"), written in Hebrew. This magazine is used to publicize the views of the leadership of the Edah HaChareidis on various issues, as well as articles on Jewish thought, including the weekly Torah portion and biographies of deceased leaders of the Yerushalmi community.

In response to day-long Haredi protests in Jerusalem in 2009, Israel's then-President Shimon Peres described the Edah as "a radical minority".

Kashrut supervision

The Edah HaChareidis is known for its high standards in rabbinical supervision of kosher food, and is considered to be one of the strictest hechsheirim in Israel. It is often simply known as the hechsher of the "Badatz", which stands for Beis Din Tzedek (literally, "Court [of] Righteous Law"), the standard term for a rabbinical appeals court. Products certified by the Edah are marked with the logo of the Edah.

Rabbinical court
Historically, the court is headed by both a Chief Rabbi, called the "Gaavad" , and by the Head of Rabbinical Court, called a "Raavad" . The "Raavad" is the first person in the line of succession of the "Gaavad", and would usually ascend to the role of "Gaavad" upon his death or resignation.

The following lists prominent members of the Edah's rabbinical court:

Chief Rabbis
1919–1932: Rabbi Yosef Chaim Sonnenfeld (1849–1932)
1932–1948: Grand Rabbi Yosef Tzvi Dushinsky, First Dushinsky Rebbe (1867–1948)
1947–1953: Rabbi Zelig Reuven Bengis (1864–1953)
1953–1979: Grand Rabbi Joel Teitelbaum of Satmar (1887–1979)
1979–1989: Rabbi Yitzchok Yaakov Weiss (1901–1989; author of Minchas Yitzchak, formerly of Manchester Beth Din, England)
1989–1996: Rabbi Moshe Aryeh Freund (1904–1996; author of Ateres Yehoshua (Chassidei Satmar)
1996–2002: Grand Rabbi Yisroel Moshe Dushinsky, Second Dushinsky Rebbe (1921–2003; son of Rabbi Yosef Tzvi Dushinsky, listed above)
2002–2022: Rabbi Yitzchok Tuvia Weiss (1926–2022; formerly dayan of the Machsike Hadass community, Antwerp, Belgium)

Presidents
1953–1979: Grand Rabbi Joel Teitelbaum of Satmar (1887–1979)
1979–2006: Grand Rabbi Moshe Teitelbaum of Satmar (1914–2006)
2006–2021: Rabbi Dovid Soloveitchik, rosh yeshiva of Brisk (1921–2021)

Past members
Rabbi Pinchas Epstein
Rabbi Yisroel Yaakov Fisher (1928–2003), author of Even Yisroel
Rabbi Moshe Halberstam (1932–2006)
Rabbi Chanoch Dov Padwa (1908–2000)
Rabbi Binyomin Rabinowitz
Rabbi Meir Brandsdorfer (1934–2009) (Chasidei Toldos Avrohom Yitzchok)
Rabbi Yaakov Blau (1929–2013)
Rabbi Naftoli Hertzke Frankel (1939–2017), Dayan of Badatz

Present members
Rabbi Moishe Sternbuch, Head of Rabbinical Court 
Rabbi Yehoshua Rosenberger (Chasidei Satmar)
Rabbi Avrohom Yitzchok Ulman (Chasidei Dushinsky)
Rabbi Yaakov Mendel Yuravitch
Rabbi Yehuda Bloi

Affiliated rabbis

 Rabbi Moshe Sacks, of Toldos Avrohom Yitzchok
 Rabbi Yaakov Meir Shechter

References

External links
Statements against Zionism by the Edah Chareidis
 

Ashkenazi Jewish culture in Jerusalem
Haredi anti-Zionism
Haredi Judaism in Jerusalem
Jewish anti-Zionism in Israel
Jewish community organizations
Kosher food certification organizations
Rabbinical organizations